Phospholipase D2 is an enzyme that in humans is encoded by the PLD2 gene.

Function 

Phosphatidylcholine (PC)-specific phospholipases D (PLDs) catalyze the hydrolysis of PC to produce phosphatidic acid and choline. Activation of PC-specific PLDs occurs as a consequence of agonist stimulation of both tyrosine kinase and G protein-coupled receptors. PC-specific PLDs have been proposed to function in regulated secretion, cytoskeletal reorganization, transcriptional regulation, and cell cycle control.[supplied by OMIM]

Mechanism of activation 
PLD2 is activated by substrate presentation. The enzyme is palmitoylated, which drives PLD2 to lipid rafts. PC substrate is polyunsaturated and resides in the membrane separately from lipid rafts near phosphatidylinositol 4,5-bisphosphate (PIP2). When PIP2 levels increase, PLD2 trafficks to PIP2 where it encounters its substrate PC. Scaffolding proteins that interact with PLD2 likely changes its preference of lipid rafts vs PIP2.

Interactions 

PLD2 has been shown to interact with:

 ARF1, 
 Aldolase A, 
 Amphiphysin, 
 BIN1, 
 Caveolin 1, 
 Glyceraldehyde 3-phosphate dehydrogenase, 
 PLCG1, 
 PRKCD, 
 Src, and
 Wiskott-Aldrich syndrome protein.

Inhibitors 
 N-(2-(1-(3-fluorophenyl)-4-oxo-1,3,8-triazaspiro[4.5]decan-8-yl)ethyl)-2-naphthamide: 75-fold selective versus PLD1, IC50 = 20 nM.

References

Further reading 

 
 
 
 
 
 
 
 
 
 
 
 
 
 
 
 
 
 

EC 3.1.4